
Gmina Wojcieszków is a rural gmina (administrative district) in Łuków County, Lublin Voivodeship, in eastern Poland.

Villages
Gmina Wojcieszków contains the villages and settlements of Burzec, Bystrzyca, Ciężkie, Helenów, Hermanów, Kolonia Bystrzycka, Marianów, Nowinki, Oszczepalin Drugi, Oszczepalin Pierwszy, Otylin, Siedliska, Świderki, Wojcieszków, Wola Bobrowa, Wola Burzecka, Wola Bystrzycka, Wólka Domaszewska, Zofibór and Zofijówka.

Neighbouring gminas
Gmina Wojcieszków is bordered by the gminas of Adamów, Borki, Krzywda, Łuków, Serokomla, Stanin and Ulan-Majorat.

References
Polish official population figures 2006

Wojcieszkow
Łuków County